John Fitzgerald Kennedy (May 29, 1917 – November 22, 1963), often referred to by his initials JFK, was an American politician who served as the 35th president of the United States from 1961 until his assassination in 1963. He was the youngest person to assume the presidency by election and the youngest president at the end of his tenure. Kennedy served at the height of the Cold War, and the majority of his foreign policy concerned relations with the Soviet Union and Cuba. A Democrat, Kennedy represented Massachusetts in both houses of the U.S. Congress prior to his presidency.

Born into the prominent Kennedy family in Brookline, Massachusetts, Kennedy graduated from Harvard University in 1940 before joining the U.S. Naval Reserve the following year. During World War II, he commanded a series of PT boats in the Pacific theater. Kennedy's survival following the sinking of PT-109 and his rescue of his fellow sailors made him a war hero and earned the Navy and Marine Corps Medal, but left him with serious injuries. After a brief stint in journalism, Kennedy represented a working-class Boston district in the U.S. House of Representatives from 1947 to 1953. He was subsequently elected to the U.S. Senate and served as the junior senator for Massachusetts from 1953 to 1960. While in the Senate, Kennedy published his book, Profiles in Courage, which won a Pulitzer Prize. Kennedy ran in the 1960 presidential election. His campaign gained momentum after the first televised presidential debates in American history, and he was elected president, narrowly defeating Republican opponent Richard Nixon, who was the incumbent vice president. He was the first Catholic elected president.

Kennedy's administration included high tensions with communist states in the Cold War. He increased the number of American military advisors in South Vietnam. He authorized numerous operations to overthrow the Cuban government of Fidel Castro, including the failed Bay of Pigs Invasion in April 1961. The following October,  U.S. spy planes discovered Soviet missile bases in Cuba; the resulting period of tensions, termed the Cuban Missile Crisis, nearly resulted in the breakout of a global thermonuclear conflict. He also signed the first nuclear weapons treaty in October 1963. Kennedy presided over the establishment of the Peace Corps, Alliance for Progress with Latin America, and the continuation of the Apollo program with the goal of landing a man on the Moon. He also supported the civil rights movement but was only somewhat successful in passing his New Frontier domestic policies.

On November 22, 1963, Kennedy was assassinated in Dallas. His vice president, Lyndon B. Johnson, assumed the presidency upon Kennedy's death. Lee Harvey Oswald, a former U.S. Marine, was arrested for the assassination, but he was shot and killed by Jack Ruby two days later. The FBI and the Warren Commission both concluded Oswald had acted alone, but conspiracy theories about the assassination exist. After Kennedy's death, Congress enacted many of his proposals, including the Civil Rights Act of 1964 and the Revenue Act of 1964. Kennedy ranks highly in polls of U.S. presidents with historians and the general public. His personal life has also been the focus of considerable sustained interest following public revelations in the 1970s of his chronic health ailments and extramarital affairs. Kennedy is the most recent U.S. president to have died in office.

Early life and education

John Fitzgerald (Jack) Kennedy was born outside Boston in Brookline, Massachusetts on May 29, 1917, at 83 Beals Street, to Joseph P. Kennedy Sr., a businessman and politician, and Rose Kennedy (née Fitzgerald), a philanthropist and socialite. His paternal grandfather, P. J. Kennedy, served as a Massachusetts state legislator. Kennedy's maternal grandfather and namesake John F. Fitzgerald served as a U.S. Congressman and was elected to two terms as Mayor of Boston. All four of his grandparents were children of Irish immigrants. Kennedy had an older brother, Joseph Jr., and seven younger siblings: Rosemary, Kathleen, Eunice, Patricia, Robert, Jean, and Edward.

Kennedy lived in Brookline for the first ten years of his life. He attended the local St. Aidan's Church, where he was baptized on June 19, 1917. He was educated through the 4th grade at the Edward Devotion School, the Noble and Greenough Lower School, and the Dexter School; all located in the Boston area. His earliest memories involved accompanying his grandfather Fitzgerald on walking tours of historic sites in Boston and discussions at the family dinner table about politics, sparking his interest in history and public service. His father's business had kept him away from the family for long stretches of time, and his ventures were concentrated on Wall Street and Hollywood. In 1927, the Dexter School announced it would not reopen before October after an outbreak of polio in Massachusetts. In September, the family decided to move from Boston by "private railway car" to the Riverdale neighborhood of New York City. Several years later, his brother Robert told Look magazine that his father had left Boston because of job signs that read: "No Irish Need Apply." The family spent summers and early autumns at their home in Hyannis Port, Massachusetts, a village on Cape Cod, where they enjoyed swimming, sailing, and touch football. Christmas and Easter holidays were spent at their winter retreat in Palm Beach, Florida. Young John attended the Riverdale Country School – a private school for boys – from 5th to 7th grade, and was a member of Boy Scout Troop 2 in Bronxville, New York. In September 1930, Kennedy, then 13 years old, was shipped off to the Canterbury School in New Milford, Connecticut, for 8th grade. In April 1931, he had an appendectomy, after which he withdrew from Canterbury and recuperated at home.

In September 1931, Kennedy started attending Choate School, a prestigious preparatory boarding school in Wallingford, Connecticut. His older brother Joe Jr. was already at Choate for two years and was a football player and leading student. Jack spent his first years at Choate in his older brother's shadow and compensated with rebellious behavior that attracted a clique. Their most notorious stunt was exploding a toilet seat with a powerful firecracker. In the next chapel assembly, the headmaster, George St. John, brandished the toilet seat and spoke of certain "muckers" who would "spit in our sea", leading Kennedy to name his group "The Muckers Club", which included roommate and lifelong friend Lem Billings.

During his years at Choate, Kennedy was beset by health problems that culminated with his emergency hospitalization in 1934 at Yale New Haven Hospital, where doctors suspected leukemia. In June 1934, he was admitted to the Mayo Clinic in Rochester, Minnesota; the ultimate diagnosis there was colitis. Kennedy graduated from Choate in June of the following year, finishing 64th in a class of 112 students. He had been the business manager of the school yearbook and was voted the "most likely to succeed".

In September 1935, Kennedy made his first trip abroad when he traveled to London with his parents and his sister Kathleen. He intended to study under Harold Laski at the London School of Economics (LSE), as his older brother had done. Ill-health forced his return to the United States in October of that year, when he enrolled late and attended Princeton University but had to leave after two months due to a gastrointestinal illness. He was then hospitalized for observation at Peter Bent Brigham Hospital in Boston. He convalesced further at the family winter home in Palm Beach, then spent the spring of 1936 working as a ranch hand on the  Jay Six cattle ranch outside Benson, Arizona. It is reported that ranchman Jack Speiden worked both brothers (Joe Jr. and John), "very hard".

In September 1936, Kennedy enrolled at Harvard College, and his application essay stated: "The reasons that I have for wishing to go to Harvard are several. I feel that Harvard can give me a better background and a better liberal education than any other university. I have always wanted to go there, as I have felt that it is not just another college, but is a university with something definite to offer. Then too, I would like to go to the same college as my father. To be a 'Harvard man' is an enviable distinction, and one that I sincerely hope I shall attain." He produced that year's annual "Freshman Smoker", called by a reviewer "an elaborate entertainment, which included in its cast outstanding personalities of the radio, screen and sports world".

He tried out for the football, golf, and swimming teams and earned a spot on the varsity swimming team. Kennedy also sailed in the Star class and won the 1936 Nantucket Sound Star Championship. In July 1937, Kennedy sailed to France—taking his convertible—and spent ten weeks driving through Europe with Billings. In June 1938, Kennedy sailed overseas with his father and older brother to work at the American embassy in London, where his father was President Franklin D. Roosevelt's U.S. Ambassador to the Court of St. James's.

In 1939, Kennedy toured Europe, the Soviet Union, the Balkans, and the Middle East in preparation for his Harvard senior honors thesis. He then went to Berlin, where the U.S. diplomatic representative gave him a secret message about war breaking out soon to pass on to his father, and to Czechoslovakia before returning to London on September 1, 1939, the day that Germany invaded Poland to mark the beginning of World War II. Two days later, the family was in the House of Commons for speeches endorsing the United Kingdom's declaration of war on Germany. Kennedy was sent as his father's representative to help with arrangements for American survivors of  before flying back to the U.S. from Foynes, Ireland, on his first transatlantic flight.

While Kennedy was an upperclassman at Harvard, he began to take his studies more seriously and developed an interest in political philosophy. He made the dean's list in his junior year. In 1940 Kennedy completed his thesis, "Appeasement in Munich", about British negotiations during the Munich Agreement. The thesis eventually became a bestseller under the title Why England Slept. In addition to addressing Britain's unwillingness to strengthen its military in the lead-up to World War II, the book also called for an Anglo-American alliance against the rising totalitarian powers. Kennedy became increasingly supportive of U.S. intervention in World War II, and his father's isolationist beliefs resulted in the latter's dismissal as ambassador to the United Kingdom. This created a split between the Kennedy and Roosevelt families.

In 1940, Kennedy graduated cum laude from Harvard with a Bachelor of Arts in government, concentrating on international affairs. That fall, he enrolled at the Stanford Graduate School of Business and audited classes there. In early 1941, Kennedy left and helped his father write a memoir of his time as an American ambassador. He then traveled throughout South America; his itinerary included Colombia, Ecuador and Peru.

U.S. Naval Reserve (1941–1945)
Kennedy planned to attend Yale Law School after auditing courses on business law at Stanford, but canceled when American entry into World War II seemed imminent. In 1940, Kennedy attempted to enter the army's Officer Candidate School. Despite months of training, he was medically disqualified due to his chronic lower back problems. On September 24, 1941, Kennedy, with the help of the director of the Office of Naval Intelligence (ONI) and the former naval attaché to Joseph Kennedy, Alan Kirk, joined the United States Naval Reserve. He was commissioned an ensign on October 26, 1941, and joined the staff of the Office of Naval Intelligence in Washington, D.C.

In January 1942, Kennedy was assigned to the ONI field office at Headquarters, Sixth Naval District, in Charleston, South Carolina. He attended the Naval Reserve Officer Training School at Northwestern University in Chicago from July 27 to September 27 and then voluntarily entered the Motor Torpedo Boat Squadrons Training Center in Melville, Rhode Island. On October 10, he was promoted to lieutenant junior grade. In early November, Kennedy was still mourning the death of his close, childhood friend, Marine Corps Second Lieutenant George Houk Mead Jr., who had been killed in action at Guadalcanal that August and awarded the Navy Cross for his bravery. Accompanied by a female acquaintance from a wealthy Newport family, the couple had stopped in Middletown, Rhode Island at the cemetery where the decorated, naval spy, Commander Hugo W. Koehler, USN, had been buried the previous year. Ambling around the plots near the tiny St. Columba's chapel, Kennedy paused over Koehler's white granite cross grave marker and pondered his own mortality, hoping out loud that when his time came, he would not have to die without religion. "But these things can't be faked," he added. "There's no bluffing." Two decades later, Kennedy and Koehler's stepson, U.S. Senator Claiborne Pell had become good friends and political allies, although they had been acquaintances since the mid-1930s during their "salad days" on the same Newport debutante party "circuit" and when Pell had dated Kathleen ("Kick") Kennedy. Kennedy completed his training on December 2 and was assigned to Motor Torpedo Squadron FOUR.

His first command was PT-101 from December 7, 1942, until February 23, 1943: It was a patrol torpedo (PT) boat used for training while Kennedy was an instructor at Melville. He then led three Huckins PT boats—PT-98, PT-99, and PT-101, which were being relocated from MTBRON 4 in Melville, Rhode Island, back to Jacksonville, Florida, and the new MTBRON 14 (formed February 17, 1943). During the trip south, he was hospitalized briefly in Jacksonville after diving into the cold water to unfoul a propeller. Thereafter, Kennedy was assigned duty in Panama and later in the Pacific theater, where he eventually commanded two more PT boats.

Commanding PT-109

In April 1943, Kennedy was assigned to Motor Torpedo Squadron TWO, and on April 24 he took command of PT-109, which was based at the time on Tulagi Island in the Solomons. On the night of August 1–2, in support of the New Georgia campaign, PT-109 was on its 31st mission with fourteen other PTs ordered to block or repel four Japanese destroyers and floatplanes carrying food, supplies, and 900 Japanese soldiers to the Vila Plantation garrison on the southern tip of the Solomon's Kolombangara Island. Intelligence had been sent to Kennedy's Commander Thomas G. Warfield expecting the arrival of the large Japanese naval force that would pass on the evening of August 1. Of the 24 torpedoes fired that night by eight of the American PTs, not one hit the Japanese convoy. On that dark and moonless night, Kennedy spotted a Japanese destroyer heading north on its return from the base of Kolombangara around 2:00 a.m., and attempted to turn to attack, when PT-109 was rammed suddenly at an angle and cut in half by the destroyer Amagiri, killing two PT-109 crew members.

Kennedy gathered around the wreckage his surviving ten crew members to vote on whether to "fight or surrender". Kennedy stated: "There's nothing in the book about a situation like this. A lot of you men have families and some of you have children. What do you want to do? I have nothing to lose." Despite re-injuring his back in the collision, Kennedy towed a badly burned crewman through the water to the island with a life jacket strap clenched between his teeth. Kennedy made an additional two-mile swim the night of August 2, 1943, to Ferguson Passage to attempt to hail a passing American PT boat to expedite his crew's rescue and attempted to make the trip on a subsequent night, in a damaged canoe found on Naru Island where he had swum with Ensign George Ross to look for food.

They swam against a strong current, and once again Kennedy towed the badly burned motor machinist "Pappy" MacMahon by his life vest. The somewhat larger Olasana Island had ripe coconut trees, but still no fresh water. Kennedy and Ross found a small canoe, packages of crackers, candy and a fifty-gallon drum of drinkable water left by the Japanese, which Kennedy paddled another half mile back to Olasana in the acquired canoe to provide his hungry crew. Native coast watchers Biuku Gasa and Eroni Kumana first discovered the 109 crew on Olasana Island and paddled their messages to Ben Kevu, a Senior Scout who sent them on to coast watcher Lieutenant Reginald Evans. On the morning of August 7, Evans radioed the PT base on Rendova. Lieutenant "Bud" Liebenow, a friend and former tentmate of Kennedy's, rescued Kennedy and his crew on Olasana Island on August 8, 1943, aboard his boat, PT-157.

Commanding PT-59
After a month's recovery Kennedy returned to duty, commanding the PT-59. He and his crew removed the original torpedo tubes and depth charges and refitted the vessel into a heavily armed gunboat, mounting two automatic 40mm guns and ten .50 caliber Browning machine guns. The new plan involved attaching a gunboat to each PT boat section, adding gun range and defensive power against barges and shore batteries which the 59 went on to encounter on several occasions from mid-October to mid-November. On October 8, 1943, Kennedy was promoted to full lieutenant. On November 2, Kennedy's PT-59 took part with two other PTs in the successful rescue of 40–50 marines. The 59 acted as a shield from shore fire and protected them as they escaped on two rescue landing craft at the base of the Warrior River at Choiseul Island, taking ten marines aboard and delivering them to safety. Under doctor's orders, Kennedy was relieved of his command of PT-59 on November 18, and sent to the hospital on Tulagi. From there he returned to the United States in early January 1944. After receiving treatment for his back injury, he was released from active duty in late 1944.

Kennedy was hospitalized at the Chelsea Naval Hospital in Chelsea, Massachusetts from May to December 1944. On June 12, he was presented the Navy and Marine Corps Medal for his heroic actions on August 1–2, 1943, and the Purple Heart Medal for his back injury while on PT-109. Beginning in January 1945, Kennedy spent three more months recovering from his back injury at Castle Hot Springs, a resort and temporary military hospital in Arizona. After the war, Kennedy felt that the medal he had received for heroism was not a combat award and asked that he be reconsidered for the Silver Star Medal for which he had been recommended initially. Kennedy's father also requested that his son receive the Silver Star, which is awarded for gallantry in action.

On August 12, 1944, Kennedy's older brother, Joe Jr., a navy pilot, was killed while on a special and hazardous air mission for which he had volunteered; his explosive-laden plane blew up when its bombs detonated prematurely over the English Channel.

On March 1, 1945, Kennedy retired from the Navy Reserve on physical disability and was honorably discharged with the full rank of lieutenant. When later asked how he became a war hero, Kennedy joked: "It was easy. They cut my PT boat in half."

In 1950, the Department of the Navy offered Kennedy a Bronze Star Medal in recognition of his meritorious service, which he declined. Kennedy's two original medals are currently on display at the John F. Kennedy Presidential Library and Museum.

Military awards
In addition to the various campaign medals received for his war service, Kennedy was awarded the Navy and Marine Corps Medal for his conduct during and after the loss of PT-109, as well as the Purple Heart for being wounded.

Navy and Marine Corps Medal citation

Journalism 
In April 1945, Kennedy's father, who was a friend of William Randolph Hearst, arranged a position for his son as a special correspondent for Hearst Newspapers; the assignment kept Kennedy's name in the public eye and "expose[d] him to journalism as a possible career". He worked as a correspondent that May and went to Berlin for a second time, covering the Potsdam Conference and other events.

Congressional career (1947–1960)
JFK's elder brother Joe had been the family's political standard-bearer and had been tapped by their father to seek the presidency. Joe's death during the war in 1944 changed that course and the assignment fell to JFK as the second eldest of the Kennedy siblings.

House of Representatives (1947–1953)
At the urging of Kennedy's father, U.S. Representative James Michael Curley vacated his seat in the strongly Democratic 11th congressional district of Massachusetts to become mayor of Boston in 1946. Kennedy established his residency at an apartment building on 122 Bowdoin Street across from the Massachusetts State House. With his father financing and running his campaign under the slogan "The New Generation Offers a Leader", Kennedy won the Democratic primary with 42 percent of the vote, defeating ten other candidates. His father joked after the campaign, "With the money I spent, I could have elected my chauffeur." Campaigning around Boston, Kennedy called for better housing for veterans, better health care for all, and support for organized labor's campaign for reasonable work hours, a healthy workplace, and the right to organize, bargain, and strike. In addition, he campaigned for peace through the United Nations and strong opposition to the Soviet Union. Though Republicans took control of the House in the 1946 elections, Kennedy defeated his Republican opponent in the general election, taking 73 percent of the vote. Along with Richard Nixon and Joseph McCarthy, Kennedy was one of several World War II veterans elected to Congress that year.

Kennedy served in the House for six years, joining the influential Education and Labor Committee and the Veterans' Affairs Committee. He concentrated his attention on international affairs, supporting the Truman Doctrine as the appropriate response to the emerging Cold War. He also supported public housing and opposed the Labor Management Relations Act of 1947, which restricted the power of labor unions. Though not as vocal an anti-communist as McCarthy, Kennedy supported the Immigration and Nationality Act of 1952, which required communists to register with the government, and he deplored the "loss of China".

Having served as a boy scout during his childhood, Kennedy was active in the Boston Council from 1946 to 1955 as district vice chairman, member of the executive board, vice-president, and National Council Representative. Almost every weekend that Congress was in session, Kennedy would fly back to Massachusetts to give speeches to veteran, fraternal, and civic groups, while maintaining an index card file on individuals who might be helpful for a future campaign for state-wide office. JFK set a goal of speaking in every city and town in Massachusetts prior to 1952.

Senate (1953–1960)

As early as 1949, Kennedy began preparing to run for the Senate in 1952 against Republican three-term incumbent Henry Cabot Lodge Jr. with the campaign slogan "KENNEDY WILL DO MORE FOR MASSACHUSETTS". Joseph Kennedy again financed his son's candidacy, while John Kennedy's younger brother Robert F. Kennedy emerged as an important member of the campaign as manager. The campaign hosted a series of "teas" (sponsored by Kennedy's mother and sisters) at hotels and parlors across Massachusetts to reach out to women voters. In the presidential election, Republican Dwight D. Eisenhower carried Massachusetts by a margin of 208,000 votes, but Kennedy defeated Lodge by 70,000 votes for the Senate seat. The following year, he married Jacqueline Bouvier.

Kennedy underwent several spinal operations over the next two years. Often absent from the Senate, he was at times critically ill and received Catholic last rites. During his convalescence in 1956, he published Profiles in Courage, a book about U.S. senators who risked their careers for their personal beliefs, for which he won the Pulitzer Prize for Biography in 1957. Rumors that this work was co-written by his close adviser and speechwriter, Ted Sorensen, were confirmed in Sorensen's 2008 autobiography.

At the start of his first term, Kennedy focused on Massachusetts-specific issues by sponsoring bills to help the fishing, textile manufacturing, and watchmaking industries. In 1954, Senator Kennedy voted in favor of the Saint Lawrence Seaway which would connect the Great Lakes to the Atlantic Ocean, despite opposition from Massachusetts politicians who argued that the project would cripple New England's shipping industry, including the Port of Boston. Three years later, Kennedy chaired a special committee to select the five greatest U.S. senators in history so their portraits could decorate the Senate Reception Room. That same year, Kennedy joined the Senate Labor Rackets Committee with his brother Robert (who was chief counsel) to investigate crime infiltration of labor unions. In 1958, Kennedy introduced a bill (S. 3974) which became the first major labor relations bill to pass either house since the Taft–Hartley Act of 1947. The bill dealt largely with the control of union abuses exposed by the McClellan committee but did not incorporate tough Taft–Hartley amendments requested by President Eisenhower. It survived Senate floor attempts to include Taft-Hartley amendments and gained passage but was rejected by the House.

At the 1956 Democratic National Convention, Kennedy gave the nominating speech for the party's presidential nominee, Adlai Stevenson II. Stevenson let the convention select the vice presidential nominee. Kennedy finished second in the balloting, losing to Senator Estes Kefauver of Tennessee but receiving national exposure as a result.

A matter demanding Kennedy's attention in the Senate was President Eisenhower's bill for the Civil Rights Act of 1957. Kennedy cast a procedural vote against it and this was considered by some to be an appeasement of Southern Democratic opponents of the bill. Kennedy did vote for Title III of the act, which would have given the Attorney General powers to enjoin, but Majority Leader Lyndon B. Johnson agreed to let the provision die as a compromise measure. Kennedy also voted for Title IV, termed the "Jury Trial Amendment". Many civil rights advocates at the time criticized that vote as one which would weaken the act. A final compromise bill, which Kennedy supported, was passed in September 1957. He proposed on July 2, 1957, that the U.S. support Algeria's effort to gain independence from France. The following year, Kennedy authored A Nation of Immigrants (later published in 1964), which analyzed the importance of immigration in the country's history as well as proposals to re-evaluate immigration law.

In 1958, Kennedy was re-elected to a second term in the Senate, defeating Republican opponent, Boston lawyer Vincent J. Celeste, by a margin of 874,608 votes, the largest margin in the history of Massachusetts politics. It was during his re-election campaign that Kennedy's press secretary at the time, Robert E. Thompson, put together a film entitled The U.S. Senator John F. Kennedy Story, which exhibited a day in the life of the Senator and showcased his family life as well as the inner workings of his office to solve Massachusetts-related issues. It was the most comprehensive film produced about Kennedy up to that time. In the aftermath of his re-election, Kennedy began preparing to run for president by traveling throughout the U.S. with the aim of building his candidacy for 1960.

When it came to conservation, Kennedy, a Massachusetts Audubon Society supporter, wanted to make sure that the shorelines of Cape Cod remained unsullied by future industrialization. On September 3, 1959, Kennedy cosponsored the Cape Cod National Seashore bill with his Republican colleague Senator Leverett Saltonstall.

Kennedy's father was a strong supporter and friend of Senator Joseph McCarthy. Additionally, Bobby Kennedy worked for McCarthy's subcommittee, and McCarthy dated Kennedy's sister Patricia. Kennedy told historian Arthur M. Schlesinger Jr., "Hell, half my voters [particularly Catholics] in Massachusetts look on McCarthy as a hero." In 1954, the Senate voted to censure McCarthy, and Kennedy drafted a speech supporting the censure. However, it was not delivered because Kennedy was hospitalized at the time. The speech put Kennedy in the apparent position of participating by "pairing" his vote against that of another senator and opposing the censure. Although Kennedy never indicated how he would have voted, the episode damaged his support among members of the liberal community, including Eleanor Roosevelt, in the 1956 and 1960 elections.

1960 presidential election

On December 17, 1959, a letter from Kennedy's staff which was to be sent to "active and influential Democrats" was leaked stating that he would announce his presidential campaign on January 2, 1960. On January 2, 1960, Kennedy announced his candidacy for the Democratic presidential nomination. Though some questioned Kennedy's age and experience, his charisma and eloquence earned him numerous supporters. Many Americans held anti-Catholic attitudes, but Kennedy's vocal support of the separation of church and state helped defuse the situation. His religion also helped him win a devoted following among many Catholic voters. Kennedy faced several potential challengers for the Democratic nomination, including Senate Majority Leader Lyndon B. Johnson, Adlai Stevenson II, and Senator Hubert Humphrey.

Kennedy's presidential campaign was a family affair, funded by his father and with his younger brother Robert, acting as his campaign manager. John preferred Ivy League policy advisors, but unlike his father, he enjoyed the give and take of Massachusetts politics and built a largely Irish team of campaigners, headed by Larry O'Brien and Kenneth O'Donnell. Kennedy traveled extensively to build his support among Democratic elites and voters. At the time, party officials controlled most of the delegates, but several states also held primaries, and Kennedy sought to win several primaries to boost his chances of winning the nomination. In his first major test, Kennedy won the Wisconsin primary, effectively ending Humphrey's hopes of winning the presidency. Nonetheless, Kennedy and Humphrey faced each other in a competitive West Virginia primary in which Kennedy could not benefit from a Catholic bloc, as he had in Wisconsin. Kennedy won the West Virginia primary, impressing many in the party, but at the start of the 1960 Democratic National Convention, it was unclear as to whether he would win the nomination.

When Kennedy entered the convention, he had the most delegates, but not enough to ensure that he would win the nomination. Stevenson—the 1952 and 1956 presidential nominee—remained very popular in the party, while Johnson also hoped to win the nomination with the support from party leaders. Kennedy's candidacy also faced opposition from former president Harry S. Truman, who was concerned about Kennedy's lack of experience. Kennedy knew that a second ballot could give the nomination to Johnson or someone else, and his well-organized campaign was able to earn the support of just enough delegates to win the presidential nomination on the first ballot.

Kennedy ignored the opposition of his brother, who wanted him to choose labor leader Walter Reuther, and other liberal supporters when he chose Johnson as his vice presidential nominee. He believed that the Texas Senator could help him win support from the South. The choice infuriated many in labor. AFL-CIO President George Meany called Johnson "the arch foe of labor", while Illinois AFL-CIO President Reuben Soderstrom asserted Kennedy had "made chumps out of leaders of the American labor movement." In accepting the presidential nomination, Kennedy gave his well-known "New Frontier" speech, saying, "For the problems are not all solved and the battles are not all won—and we stand today on the edge of a New Frontier. ... But the New Frontier of which I speak is not a set of promises—it is a set of challenges. It sums up not what I intend to offer the American people, but what I intend to ask of them."

At the start of the fall general election campaign, the Republican nominee and incumbent vice president Richard Nixon held a six-point lead in the polls. Major issues included how to get the economy moving again, Kennedy's Roman Catholicism, the Cuban Revolution, and whether the space and missile programs of the Soviet Union had surpassed those of the U.S. To address fears that his being Catholic would impact his decision-making, he told the Greater Houston Ministerial Association on September 12, 1960: "I am not the Catholic candidate for president. I am the Democratic Party candidate for president who also happens to be a Catholic. I do not speak for my Church on public matters—and the Church does not speak for me." Kennedy questioned rhetorically whether one-quarter of Americans were relegated to second-class citizenship just because they were Catholic, and once stated that "[n]o one asked me my religion [serving the Navy] in the South Pacific". Despite Kennedy's efforts to quell anti-Catholic concerns and similar statements by high-profile Protestant figures, religious bigotry would dog the Democratic candidate through the end of the campaign. His score among white Protestants would ultimately be lower than Adlai Stevenson's in 1956, though Stevenson lost his election. Some Catholic leaders also expressed reservations about Kennedy, but the vast majority of laypeople rallied to him.

Nixon attended the first of these debates after a day of campaigning, whilst running a fever and having previously suffered an infected leg injury earlier in the campaign. During the debate Nixon looked at the reporters asking questions and not at the camera, and was perspirating which his makeup accentuated. He wore a tan suit which reduced his presence against the set background and his fast-growing facial hair was visible as "five o'clock shadow". In contrast, Kennedy had spent the preceding days on debate preparation, appeared relaxed and looked into the camera whilst answering questions. It is commonly said that Kennedy appearing to be the more attractive man of the two won him the debate, largely because of a poll in which voters who watched on TV thought that Kennedy had won but radio listeners believed Nixon to have won. However, only one poll split TV and radio voters like this and the methodology of the pollsters was poor, failing to account for pre-debate political or religious biases and only interviewing 178 radio listeners who believed the debate had been won by either candidate. The location of the polling is also unknown, even though Nixon would have been more popular pre-debate anyway in Protestant, rural areas with less access to television. 1960 was a close race and there is no polling available consistent with the idea that Nixon lost or Kennedy gained support as a result of the debate.  Vancil and Pendell point out that Nixon did not win the debate by strength of argument either; Democratic figures were satisfied with Kennedy's debate performance and even many Southern Democrats who had been apathetic or hostile towards Kennedy were impressed, but Nixon's performance alarmed Republican figures who thought that his defensiveness and me-tooism (repeatedly emphasising his agreement with Kennedy) realised their worst fears and was a surprisingly poor performance from him. The debates are now considered a milestone in American political history—the point at which the medium of television began to play a dominant role in politics.

Kennedy's campaign gained momentum after the first debate, and he pulled slightly ahead of Nixon in most polls. On Election Day, Kennedy defeated Nixon in one of the closest presidential elections of the 20th century. In the national popular vote, by most accounts, Kennedy led Nixon by just two-tenths of one percent (49.7% to 49.5%), while in the Electoral College, he won 303 votes to Nixon's 219 (269 were needed to win). Fourteen electors from Mississippi and Alabama refused to support Kennedy because of his support for the civil rights movement; they voted for Senator Harry F. Byrd of Virginia, as did an elector from Oklahoma. Forty-three years old, Kennedy was the youngest person ever elected to the presidency (though Theodore Roosevelt was a year younger when, as vice-president, he succeeded to the presidency after the assassination of William McKinley in 1901).

Presidency (1961–1963)

John F. Kennedy was sworn in as the 35th president at noon on January 20, 1961. In his inaugural address, he spoke of the need for all Americans to be active citizens: "Ask not what your country can do for you—ask what you can do for your country." He asked the nations of the world to join to fight what he called the "common enemies of man: tyranny, poverty, disease, and war itself". He added:

"All this will not be finished in the first one hundred days. Nor will it be finished in the first one thousand days, nor in the life of this Administration, nor even perhaps in our lifetime on this planet. But let us begin." In closing, he expanded on his desire for greater internationalism: "Finally, whether you are citizens of America or citizens of the world, ask of us here the same high standards of strength and sacrifice which we ask of you."

The address reflected Kennedy's confidence that his administration would chart a historically significant course in both domestic policy and foreign affairs. The contrast between this optimistic vision and the pressures of managing daily political realities at home and abroad would be one of the main tensions running through the early years of his administration.

Kennedy brought to the White House a contrast in organization compared to the decision-making structure of former General Eisenhower, and he wasted no time in scrapping Eisenhower's methods. Kennedy preferred the organizational structure of a wheel with all the spokes leading to the president. He was ready and willing to make the increased number of quick decisions required in such an environment. He selected a mixture of experienced and inexperienced people to serve in his cabinet. "We can learn our jobs together", he stated.

Much to the chagrin of his economic advisors, who wanted him to reduce taxes, Kennedy quickly agreed to a balanced budget pledge. This was needed in exchange for votes to expand the membership of the House Rules Committee in order to give the Democrats a majority in setting the legislative agenda. Kennedy focused on immediate and specific issues facing the administration and quickly voiced his impatience with pondering deeper meanings. Deputy National Security Advisor Walt Whitman Rostow once began a diatribe about the growth of communism, and Kennedy abruptly cut him off, asking, "What do you want me to do about that today?"

Kennedy approved Defense Secretary Robert McNamara's controversial decision to award the contract for the F-111 TFX (Tactical Fighter Experimental) fighter-bomber to General Dynamics (the choice of the civilian Defense department) over Boeing (the choice of the military). At the request of Senator Henry Jackson, Senator John McClellan held 46 days of mostly closed-door hearings before the Permanent Subcommittee on Investigations investigating the TFX contract from February to November 1963.

During the summer of 1962, Kennedy had a secret taping system set up in the White House, most likely to aid his future memoir. It recorded many conversations with Kennedy and his Cabinet members, including those in relation to the "Cuban Missile Crisis".

Foreign policy

Kennedy's foreign policy was dominated by American confrontations with the Soviet Union, manifested by proxy contests in the early stage of the Cold War. In 1961 he anxiously anticipated a summit with Soviet Premier Nikita Khrushchev. He started off on the wrong foot by reacting aggressively to a routine Khrushchev speech on Cold War confrontation in early 1961. The speech was intended for domestic audiences in the Soviet Union, but Kennedy interpreted it as a personal challenge. His mistake helped raise tensions going into the Vienna summit of June 1961.

On the way to the summit, Kennedy stopped in Paris to meet French President Charles de Gaulle, who advised him to ignore Khrushchev's abrasive style. The French president feared the United States' presumed influence in Europe. Nevertheless, de Gaulle was quite impressed with the young president and his family. Kennedy picked up on this in his speech in Paris, saying that he would be remembered as "the man who accompanied Jackie Kennedy to Paris".

On June 4, 1961, Kennedy met with Khrushchev in Vienna and left the meetings angry and disappointed that he had allowed the premier to bully him, despite the warnings he had received. Khrushchev, for his part, was impressed with the president's intelligence but thought him weak. Kennedy did succeed in conveying the bottom line to Khrushchev on the most sensitive issue before them, a proposed treaty between Moscow and East Berlin. He made it clear that any treaty interfering with U.S. access rights in West Berlin would be regarded as an act of war. Shortly after Kennedy returned home, the U.S.S.R. announced its plan to sign a treaty with East Berlin, abrogating any third-party occupation rights in either sector of the city. Depressed and angry, Kennedy assumed that his only option was to prepare the country for nuclear war, which he personally thought had a one-in-five chance of occurring.

In the weeks immediately following the Vienna summit, more than 20,000 people fled from East Berlin to the western sector, reacting to statements from the U.S.S.R. Kennedy began intensive meetings on the Berlin issue, where Dean Acheson took the lead in recommending a military buildup alongside NATO allies. In a July 1961 speech, Kennedy announced his decision to add $3.25 billion (equivalent to $ billion in ) to the defense budget, along with over 200,000 additional troops, stating that an attack on West Berlin would be taken as an attack on the U.S. The speech received an 85% approval rating.

A month later, both the Soviet Union and East Berlin began blocking any further passage of East Germans into West Berlin and erected barbed wire fences, which were quickly upgraded to the Berlin Wall, around the city. Kennedy's initial reaction was to ignore this, as long as free access from the West to West Berlin continued. This course was altered when West Berliners had lost confidence in the defense of their position by the United States. Kennedy sent Vice President Johnson and Lucius D. Clay, along with a host of military personnel, in convoy through East Germany, including Soviet-armed checkpoints, to demonstrate the continued commitment of the U.S. to West Berlin.

Kennedy gave a speech at Saint Anselm College on May 5, 1960, regarding America's conduct in the emerging Cold War. His address detailed how he felt American foreign policy should be conducted towards African nations, noting a hint of support for modern African nationalism by saying, "For we, too, founded a new nation on revolt from colonial rule."

Cuba and the Bay of Pigs Invasion

The Eisenhower administration had created a plan to overthrow Fidel Castro's regime in Cuba. Led by the Central Intelligence Agency (CIA), with help from the U.S. military, the plan was for an invasion of Cuba by a counter-revolutionary insurgency composed of U.S.-trained, anti-Castro Cuban exiles led by CIA paramilitary officers. The intention was to invade Cuba and instigate an uprising among the Cuban people, hoping to remove Castro from power. Kennedy approved the final invasion plan on April 4, 1961.

The Bay of Pigs Invasion began on April 17, 1961. Fifteen hundred U.S.-trained Cubans, dubbed Brigade 2506, landed on the island. No U.S. air support was provided. CIA director Allen Dulles later stated that they thought Kennedy would authorize any action that was needed for success once the troops were on the ground.

By April 19, 1961, the Cuban government had captured or killed the invading exiles, and Kennedy was forced to negotiate for the release of the 1,189 survivors. Twenty months later, Cuba released the captured exiles in exchange for $53 million worth of food and medicine. The incident made Castro feel wary of the U.S. and led him to believe that another invasion would take place.

Biographer Richard Reeves said that Kennedy focused primarily on the political repercussions of the plan rather than military considerations. When it proved unsuccessful, he was convinced that the plan was a setup to make him look bad. He took responsibility for the failure, saying, "We got a big kick in the leg and we deserved it. But maybe we'll learn something from it." He appointed Robert Kennedy to help lead a committee to examine the causes of the failure.

In late-1961, the White House formed the Special Group (Augmented), headed by Robert Kennedy and including Edward Lansdale, Secretary Robert McNamara, and others. The group's objective—to overthrow Castro via espionage, sabotage, and other covert tactics—was never pursued. In November 1961, he authorized Operation Mongoose. In March 1962, Kennedy rejected Operation Northwoods, proposals for false flag attacks against American military and civilian targets, and blaming them on the Cuban government in order to gain approval for a war against Cuba. However, the administration continued to plan for an invasion of Cuba in the summer of 1962.

Cuban Missile Crisis

On October 14, 1962, CIA U-2 spy planes took photographs of the Soviets' construction of intermediate-range ballistic missile sites in Cuba. The photos were shown to Kennedy on October 16; a consensus was reached that the missiles were offensive in nature and thus posed an immediate nuclear threat.

Kennedy faced a dilemma: if the U.S. attacked the sites, it might lead to nuclear war with the U.S.S.R., but if the U.S. did nothing, it would be faced with the increased threat from close-range nuclear weapons. The U.S. would also appear to the world as less committed to the defense of the hemisphere. On a personal level, Kennedy needed to show resolve in reaction to Khrushchev, especially after the Vienna summit.

More than a third of U.S. National Security Council (NSC) members favored an unannounced air assault on the missile sites, but for some of them this conjured up an image of "Pearl Harbor in reverse". There was also some concern from the international community (asked in confidence), that the assault plan was an overreaction in light of the fact that Eisenhower had placed PGM-19 Jupiter missiles in Italy and Turkey in 1958. It also could not be assured that the assault would be 100% effective. In concurrence with a majority-vote of the NSC, Kennedy decided on a naval quarantine. On October 22, he dispatched a message to Khrushchev and announced the decision on TV.

The U.S. Navy would stop and inspect all Soviet ships arriving off Cuba, beginning October 24. The Organization of American States gave unanimous support to the removal of the missiles. Kennedy exchanged two sets of letters with Khrushchev, to no avail. United Nations (UN) Secretary General U Thant requested both parties to reverse their decisions and enter a cooling-off period. Khrushchev agreed, but Kennedy did not.

One Soviet-flagged ship was stopped and boarded. On October 28, Khrushchev agreed to dismantle the missile sites, subject to UN inspections. The U.S. publicly promised never to invade Cuba and privately agreed to remove its Jupiter missiles from Italy and Turkey, which were by then obsolete and had been supplanted by submarines equipped with UGM-27 Polaris missiles.

This crisis brought the world closer to nuclear war than at any point before or after. It is considered that "the humanity" of both Khrushchev and Kennedy prevailed. The crisis improved the image of American willpower and the president's credibility. Kennedy's approval rating increased from 66% to 77% immediately thereafter.

Latin America and communism

Believing that "those who make peaceful revolution impossible, will make violent revolution inevitable," Kennedy sought to contain the perceived threat of communism in Latin America by establishing the Alliance for Progress, which sent aid to some countries and sought greater human rights standards in the region. He worked closely with Puerto Rican Governor Luis Muñoz Marín for the development of the Alliance of Progress and began working to further Puerto Rico's autonomy.

The Eisenhower administration, through the CIA, had begun formulating plans to assassinate Castro in Cuba and Rafael Trujillo in the Dominican Republic. When Kennedy took office, he privately instructed the CIA that any plan must include plausible deniability by the U.S. His public position was in opposition. In June 1961, the Dominican Republic's leader was assassinated; in the days following, Undersecretary of State Chester Bowles led a cautious reaction by the nation. Robert Kennedy, who saw an opportunity for the U.S., called Bowles "a gutless bastard" to his face.

Peace Corps

In one of his first presidential acts, Kennedy asked Congress to create the Peace Corps. His brother-in-law, Sargent Shriver, was its first director. Through this program, Americans volunteered to help developing nations in fields like education, farming, health care, and construction. The organization grew to 5,000 members by March 1963 and 10,000 the year after. Since 1961, over 200,000 Americans have joined the Peace Corps, representing 139 countries.

Southeast Asia

As a U.S. Congressman in 1951, Kennedy became fascinated with Vietnam after visiting the area as part of a big fact-finding mission to Asia and the Middle East, even stressing in a subsequent radio address that he strongly favored "check[ing] the southern drive of communism." As a U.S. senator in 1956, Kennedy publicly advocated for greater U.S. involvement in Vietnam. When briefing Kennedy, Eisenhower emphasized that the communist threat in Southeast Asia required priority; Eisenhower considered Laos to be "the cork in the bottle" regarding the regional threat. In March 1961, Kennedy voiced a change in policy from supporting a "free" Laos to a "neutral" Laos, indicating privately that Vietnam, and not Laos, should be deemed America's tripwire for communism's spread in the area. In May, he dispatched Lyndon Johnson to meet with South Vietnamese President Ngo Dinh Diem. Johnson assured Diem more aid to mold a fighting force that could resist the communists. Kennedy announced a change of policy from support to partnership with Diem to defeat of communism in South Vietnam.

During his presidency, Kennedy continued policies that provided political, economic, and military support to the governments of South Korea and South Vietnam.

We have one-million Americans today serving outside the United-States. There's no other country in history that's carried this kind of a burden. Other countries have had forces serving outside their own country, but for conquest. We have two divisions in South-Korea, not to control South-Korea, but to defend it. We have a lot of Americans in South Vietnam. Well, no other country in the world has ever done that since the beginning of the world; Greece, Rome, Napoleon, and all the rest, always had conquest. We have a million men outside, and they try to defend these countries.

The Viet Cong began assuming a predominant presence in late 1961, initially seizing the provincial capital of Phuoc Vinh. After a mission to Vietnam in October, presidential adviser General Maxwell D. Taylor and Deputy National Security Adviser Walt Rostow recommended the deployment of 6,000 to 8,000 U.S. combat troops to Vietnam.  Kennedy increased the number of military advisers and special forces in the area, from 11,000 in 1962 to 16,000 by late 1963, but he was reluctant to order a full-scale deployment of troops. However, Kennedy, who was wary about the region's successful war of independence against France, was also eager to not give the impression to the Vietnamese people that the United States was acting as the region's new colonizer, even stating in his journal at one point that the United States was "more and more becoming colonists in the minds of the people." A year and three months later on March 8, 1965, his successor, President Lyndon Johnson, committed the first combat troops to Vietnam and greatly escalated U.S. involvement, with forces reaching 184,000 that year and 536,000 in 1968.

In late 1961, Kennedy sent Roger Hilsman, then director of the State Department's Bureau of Intelligence and Research, to assess the situation in Vietnam. There, Hilsman met Sir Robert Grainger Ker Thompson, head of the British Advisory Mission to South Vietnam, and the Strategic Hamlet Program was formed. It was approved by Kennedy and South Vietnam President Ngo Dinh Diem. It was implemented in early 1962 and involved some forced relocation, village internment, and segregation of rural South Vietnamese into new communities where the peasantry would be isolated from communist insurgents. It was hoped that these new communities would provide security for the peasants and strengthen the tie between them and the central government. By November 1963, the program waned and officially ended in 1964.

In early 1962, Kennedy formally authorized escalated involvement when he signed the National Security Action Memorandum – "Subversive Insurgency (War of Liberation)". "Operation Ranch Hand", a large-scale aerial defoliation effort, began on the roadsides of South Vietnam. Depending on which assessment Kennedy accepted (Department of Defense or State), there had been zero or modest progress in countering the increase in communist aggression in return for an expanded U.S. involvement.

In April 1963, Kennedy assessed the situation in Vietnam, saying, "We don't have a prayer of staying in Vietnam. Those people hate us. They are going to throw our asses out of there at any point. But I can't give up that territory to the communists and get the American people to re-elect me."

On August 21, just as the new U.S. Ambassador Henry Cabot Lodge Jr. arrived, Diem and his brother Ngo Dinh Nhu ordered South Vietnam forces, funded and trained by the CIA, to quell Buddhist demonstrations. The crackdowns heightened expectations of a coup d'état to remove Diem with (or perhaps by) his brother, Nhu. Lodge was instructed to try getting Diem and Nhu to step down and leave the country. Diem would not listen to Lodge. Cable 243 (DEPTEL 243) followed, dated August 24, declaring that Washington would no longer tolerate Nhu's actions, and Lodge was ordered to pressure Diem to remove Nhu. Lodge concluded that the only option was to get the South Vietnamese generals to overthrow Diem and Nhu. At week's end, orders were sent to Saigon and throughout Washington to "destroy all coup cables". At the same time, the first formal anti-Vietnam war sentiment was expressed by U.S. clergy from the Ministers' Vietnam Committee.

A White House meeting in September was indicative of the different ongoing appraisals; Kennedy received updated assessments after personal inspections on the ground by the Departments of Defense (General Victor Krulak) and State (Joseph Mendenhall). Krulak said that the military fight against the communists was progressing and being won, while Mendenhall stated that the country was civilly being lost to any U.S. influence. Kennedy reacted, asking, "Did you two gentlemen visit the same country?" Kennedy was unaware that both men were so much at odds that they did not speak to each other on the return flight.

In October 1963, Kennedy appointed Defense Secretary McNamara and General Maxwell D. Taylor to a Vietnamese mission in another effort to synchronize the information and formulation of policy. The objective of the McNamara Taylor mission "emphasized the importance of getting to the bottom of the differences in reporting from U.S. representatives in Vietnam". In meetings with McNamara, Taylor, and Lodge, Diem again refused to agree to governing measures, helping to dispel McNamara's previous optimism about Diem. Taylor and McNamara were enlightened by Vietnam's vice president, Nguyen Ngoc Tho (choice of many to succeed Diem), who in detailed terms obliterated Taylor's information that the military was succeeding in the countryside. At Kennedy's insistence, the mission report contained a recommended schedule for troop withdrawals: 1,000 by year's end and complete withdrawal in 1965, something the NSC considered to be a "strategic fantasy".

In late October, intelligence wires again reported that a coup against the Diem government was afoot. The source, Vietnamese General Duong Van Minh (also known as "Big Minh"), wanted to know the U.S. position. Kennedy instructed Lodge to offer covert assistance to the coup, excluding assassination. On November 1, 1963, South Vietnamese generals, led by "Big Minh", overthrew the Diem government, arresting and then killing Diem and Nhu. Kennedy was shocked by the deaths.

News of the coup led to renewed confidence initially—both in America and in South Vietnam—that the war might be won. McGeorge Bundy drafted a National Security Action Memo to present to Kennedy upon his return from Dallas. It reiterated the resolve to fight communism in Vietnam, with increasing military and economic aid and expansion of operations into Laos and Cambodia. Before leaving for Dallas, Kennedy told Michael Forrestal that "after the first of the year ... [he wanted] an in depth study of every possible option, including how to get out of there ... to review this whole thing from the bottom to the top". Asked what he thought Kennedy meant, Forrestal said, "It was devil's advocate stuff."

Historians disagree on whether the Vietnam War would have escalated if Kennedy had not been assassinated and had won re-election in 1964. Fueling the debate were statements made by Secretary of Defense McNamara in the film "The Fog of War" that Kennedy was strongly considering pulling the United States out of Vietnam after the 1964 election. The film also contains a tape recording of Lyndon Johnson stating that Kennedy was planning to withdraw, a position in which Johnson disagreed. Kennedy had signed National Security Action Memorandum (NSAM) 263, dated October 11, which ordered the withdrawal of 1,000 military personnel by year's end, and the bulk of them out by 1965. Such an action would have been a policy reversal, but Kennedy was publicly moving in a less hawkish direction since his speech on world peace at American University on June 10, 1963.

At the time of Kennedy's death, no final policy decision was made to Vietnam. In 2008, Kennedy administration White House Counsel and speechwriter Ted Sorensen wrote, "I would like to believe that Kennedy would have found a way to withdraw all American instructors and advisors [from Vietnam]. But ... I do not believe he knew in his last weeks what he was going to do." Sorensen added that, in his opinion, Vietnam "was the only foreign policy problem handed off by JFK to his successor in no better, and possibly worse, shape than it was when he inherited it." U.S. involvement in the region escalated until his successor Lyndon Johnson directly deployed regular U.S. military forces for fighting the Vietnam War. After Kennedy's assassination, President Johnson signed NSAM 273 on November 26, 1963. It reversed Kennedy's decision to withdraw 1,000 troops, and reaffirmed the policy of assistance to the South Vietnamese.

American University speech

On June 10, 1963, Kennedy, at the high point of his rhetorical powers, delivered the commencement address at American University in Washington, D.C. Also known as "A Strategy of Peace", not only did Kennedy outline a plan to curb nuclear arms, but he also "laid out a hopeful, yet realistic route for world peace at a time when the U.S. and Soviet Union faced the potential for an escalating nuclear arms race." Kennedy wished

to discuss a topic on which too often ignorance abounds and the truth is too rarely perceived—yet it is the most important topic on earth: world peace ... I speak of peace because of the new face of war ... in an age when a singular nuclear weapon contains ten times the explosive force delivered by all the allied forces in the Second World War ... an age when the deadly poisons produced by a nuclear exchange would be carried by wind and air and soil and seed to the far corners of the globe and to generations yet unborn ... I speak of peace, therefore, as the necessary rational end of rational men ... world peace, like community peace, does not require that each man love his neighbor—it requires only that they live together in mutual tolerance ... our problems are man-made—therefore they can be solved by man. And man can be as big as he wants.

Kennedy also made two announcements: 1.) that the Soviets had expressed a desire to negotiate a nuclear test ban treaty, and 2.) that the U.S. had postponed planned atmospheric tests.

West Berlin speech

In 1963, Germany was enduring a time of particular vulnerability due to Soviet aggression to the east as well as the impending retirement of West German Chancellor Adenauer. At the same time, French President Charles de Gaulle was trying to build a Franco-West German counterweight to the American and Soviet spheres of influence. To Kennedy's eyes, this Franco-German cooperation seemed directed against NATO's influence in Europe.

To reinforce the U.S. alliance with West Germany, Kennedy travelled to West Germany and West Berlin in June 1963. On June 26, Kennedy toured West Berlin, culminating in a public speech at West Berlin's city hall in front of hundreds of thousands of enthusiastic Berliners.  He reiterated the American commitment to Germany and criticized communism, and was met with an ecstatic response from a massive audience. Kennedy used the construction of the Berlin Wall as an example of the failures of communism: "Freedom has many difficulties, and democracy is not perfect. But we have never had to put a wall up to keep our people in, to prevent them from leaving us." The speech is known for its famous phrase "Ich bin ein Berliner" ("I am a Berliner"), which Kennedy himself had begun to try out in preparation for the trip. Kennedy remarked to Ted Sorensen afterwards: "We'll never have another day like this one, as long as we live."

Israel
In 1960, Kennedy stated, "Israel will endure and flourish. It is the child of hope and the home of the brave. It can neither be broken by adversity nor demoralized by success. It carries the shield of democracy and it honors the sword of freedom."

As president, Kennedy initiated the creation of security ties with Israel, and he is credited as the founder of the US-Israeli military alliance, which would be continued under subsequent presidents. Kennedy ended the arms embargo that the Eisenhower and Truman administrations had enforced on Israel. Describing the protection of Israel as a moral and national commitment, he was the first to introduce the concept of a "special relationship" (as he described it to Golda Meir) between the US and Israel.

Kennedy extended the first informal security guarantees to Israel in 1962 and, beginning in 1963, was the first US president to allow the sale to Israel of advanced US weaponry (the MIM-23 Hawk) as well as to provide diplomatic support for Israeli policies, which were opposed by Arab neighbors; those policies included Israel's water project on the Jordan River.

As a result of this newly created security alliance, Kennedy also encountered tensions with the Israeli government over the production of nuclear materials in Dimona, which he believed could instigate a nuclear arms-race in the Middle East. After the existence of a nuclear plant was initially denied by the Israeli government, David Ben-Gurion stated in a speech to the Israeli Knesset on December 21, 1960, that the purpose of the nuclear plant at Beersheba was for "research in problems of arid zones and desert flora and fauna". When Ben-Gurion met with Kennedy in New York, he claimed that Dimona was being developed to provide nuclear power for desalinization and other peaceful purposes "for the time being".

In 1963 the Kennedy administration was engaged in a now-declassified diplomatic standoff with the leaders of Israel. In a May 1963 letter to Ben-Gurion, Kennedy wrote that he was skeptical and stated that American support to Israel could be in jeopardy if reliable information on the Israeli nuclear program was not forthcoming, Ben-Gurion repeated previous reassurances that Dimona was being developed for peaceful purposes. The Israeli government resisted American pressure to open its nuclear facilities to International Atomic Energy Agency (IAEA) inspections. In 1962 the US and Israeli governments had agreed to an annual inspection regime. A science attaché at the embassy in Tel Aviv concluded that parts of the Dimona facility had been shut down temporarily to mislead American scientists when they visited.

According to Seymour Hersh, the Israelis set up false control rooms to show the Americans. Israeli lobbyist Abe Feinberg stated: "It was part of my job to tip them off that Kennedy was insisting on [an inspection]." Hersh contends that the inspections were conducted in such a way that it "guaranteed that the whole procedure would be little more than a whitewash, as the president and his senior advisors had to understand: the American inspection team would have to schedule its visits well in advance, and with the full acquiescence of Israel." Marc Trachtenberg argued that "[a]lthough [he was] well aware of what the Israelis were doing, Kennedy chose to take this as satisfactory evidence of Israeli compliance with America's non-proliferation policy." The documents reveal the deep concern the Kennedy Administration had over Dimona, and while Kennedy understood the United States and the international community may not be capable of preventing Israel or any nation, he certainly was not satisfied to learn Israel was using Dimona for the production of plutonium. The American who led the inspection team stated that the essential goal of the inspections was to find "ways to not reach the point of taking action against Israel's nuclear weapons program".

Rodger Davies, the director of the State Department's Office of Near Eastern Affairs, concluded in March 1965 that Israel was developing nuclear weapons. He reported that Israel's target date for achieving nuclear capability was 1968–1969. On May 1, 1968, Undersecretary of State Nicholas Katzenbach told President Johnson that Dimona was producing enough plutonium to produce two bombs a year. The State Department argued that if Israel wanted arms, it should accept international supervision of its nuclear program. Dimona was never placed under IAEA safeguards. Attempts to write Israeli adherence to the Nuclear Non-Proliferation Treaty (NPT) into contracts for the supply of U.S. weapons continued throughout 1968.

Israeli national interests to an extent were also at odds with Kennedy's endorsement of the United Nation's Johnson Plan, which devised a plan to return a small percentage of displaced Palestinians from the war of 1948 into what was by then, Israel. This continuation of the late UN Secretary General Dag Hammarskjold's plan for Palestinian repatriation particularity disturbed persons who had a hard line view of even Arab resettlement in Israel, or the more heavily feared, full repatriation. The Johnson plan was spearheaded by the Palestine Conciliation Commission's Dr. Joseph Ersey Johnson, while the United Nations attempted to oversee progression from writing - into action.

Iraq

Relations between the United States and Iraq became strained following the overthrow of the Iraqi monarchy on July 14, 1958, which resulted in the declaration of a republican government led by Brigadier Abd al-Karim Qasim. On June 25, 1961, Qasim mobilized troops along the border between Iraq and Kuwait, declaring the latter nation "an indivisible part of Iraq" and causing a short-lived "Kuwait Crisis". The United Kingdom—which had just granted Kuwait independence on June 19, and whose economy was dependent on Kuwaiti oil—responded on July 1 by dispatching 5,000 troops to the country to deter an Iraqi invasion. At the same time, Kennedy dispatched a U.S. Navy task force to Bahrain, and the UK, at the urging of the Kennedy administration, brought the dispute to United Nations Security Council, where the proposed resolution was vetoed by the Soviet Union. The situation was resolved in October, when the British troops were withdrawn and replaced by a 4,000-strong Arab League force, which acted as a barrier against the Iraqi threat.

In December 1961, Qasim's government passed Public Law 80, which restricted the partially American-controlled Iraq Petroleum Company (IPC)'s concessionary holding to those areas in which oil was actually being produced, effectively expropriating 99.5% of the IPC concession. U.S. officials were alarmed by the expropriation as well as the recent Soviet veto of an Egyptian-sponsored UN resolution requesting the admittance of Kuwait as UN member state, which they believed were connected. Senior National Security Council adviser Robert Komer worried that if the IPC ceased production in response, Qasim might "grab Kuwait" (thus achieving a "stranglehold" on Middle Eastern oil production) or "throw himself into Russian arms". Komer also made note of widespread rumors that a nationalist coup against Qasim could be imminent, and had the potential to "get Iraq back on [a] more neutral keel".

In April 1962, the State Department issued new guidelines on Iraq that were intended to increase American influence there. Meanwhile, Kennedy instructed the CIA—under the direction of Archibald Bulloch Roosevelt Jr.—to begin making preparations for a military coup against Qasim.

The anti-imperialist and anti-communist Iraqi Ba'ath Party overthrew and executed Qasim in a violent coup on February 8, 1963. While there have been persistent rumors that the CIA orchestrated the coup, declassified documents and the testimony of former CIA officers indicate that there was no direct American involvement, although the CIA was actively seeking a suitable replacement for Qasim within the Iraqi military and had been informed of an earlier Ba'athist coup plot. The Kennedy administration was pleased with the outcome and ultimately approved a $55-million arms deal for Iraq.

Ireland

During his four-day visit to his ancestral home of Ireland beginning on June 26, 1963, Kennedy accepted a grant of armorial bearings from the Chief Herald of Ireland, received honorary degrees from the National University of Ireland and Trinity College Dublin, attended a State Dinner in Dublin, and was conferred with the freedom of the towns and cities of Wexford, Cork, Dublin, Galway, and Limerick. He visited the cottage at Dunganstown, near New Ross, County Wexford, where his ancestors had lived before emigrating to America.

Kennedy also was the first foreign leader to address the Houses of the Oireachtas, the Irish parliament.
Kennedy later told aides that the trip was the best four days of his life.

Nuclear Test Ban Treaty

Troubled by the long-term dangers of radioactive contamination and nuclear weapons proliferation, Kennedy and Khrushchev agreed to negotiate a nuclear test ban treaty, originally conceived in Adlai Stevenson's 1956 presidential campaign. In their Vienna summit meeting in June 1961, Khrushchev and Kennedy both reached an informal understanding against nuclear testing, but the Soviet Union began testing nuclear weapons that September. In response, the United States conducted tests five days later. Shortly afterwards, new U.S. satellites began delivering images that made it clear that the Soviets were substantially behind the U.S. in the arms race. Nevertheless, the greater nuclear strength of the U.S. was of little value as long as the U.S.S.R. perceived itself to be at parity.

In July 1963, Kennedy sent W. Averell Harriman to Moscow to negotiate a treaty with the Soviets. The introductory sessions included Khrushchev, who later delegated Soviet representation to Andrei Gromyko. It quickly became clear that a comprehensive test ban would not be implemented, due largely to the reluctance of the Soviets to allow inspections that would verify compliance.

Ultimately, the United States, the United Kingdom, and the Soviet Union were the initial signatories to a limited treaty, which prohibited atomic testing on the ground, in the atmosphere, or underwater, but not underground. The U.S. Senate ratified this and Kennedy signed it into law in October 1963. France was quick to declare that it was free to continue developing and testing its nuclear defenses.

Domestic policy

Kennedy called his domestic program the "New Frontier". It ambitiously promised federal funding for education, medical care for the elderly, economic aid to rural regions, and government intervention to halt the recession. He also promised an end to racial discrimination, although his agenda, which included the endorsement of the Voter Education Project (VEP) in 1962, produced little progress in areas such as Mississippi, where the "VEP concluded that discrimination was so entrenched".

In his 1963 State of the Union address, he proposed substantial tax reform and a reduction in income tax rates from the current range of 20–90% to a range of 14–65% as well as a reduction in the corporate tax rates from 52 to 47%. Kennedy added that the top rate should be set at 70% if certain deductions were not eliminated for high-income earners. Congress did not act until 1964, a year after his death, when the top individual rate was lowered to 70%, and the top corporate rate was set at 48%.

To the Economic Club of New York, he spoke in 1963 of "... the paradoxical truth that tax rates are too high and revenues too low; and the soundest way to raise revenue in the long term is to lower rates now." Congress passed few of Kennedy's major programs during his lifetime, but did vote them through in 1964 and 1965 under his successor Johnson.

Economy

Kennedy ended a period of tight fiscal policies, loosening monetary policy to keep interest rates down and to encourage growth of the economy. He presided over the first government budget to top the $100 billion mark, in 1962, and his first budget in 1961 resulted in the nation's first non-war, non-recession deficit. The economy, which had been through two recessions in three years and was in one when Kennedy took office, accelerated notably throughout his administration. Despite low inflation and interest rates, the GDP had grown by an average of only 2.2% per annum during the Eisenhower administration (scarcely more than population growth at the time), and it had declined by 1% during Eisenhower's last twelve months in office.

The economy turned around and prospered during Kennedy's years as president. The GDP expanded by an average of 5.5% from early-1961 to late-1963, while inflation remained steady at around 1% and unemployment eased. Industrial production rose by 15% and motor vehicle sales increased by 40%. This rate of growth in GDP and industry continued until 1969, and has yet to be repeated for such a sustained period of time.

Attorney General Robert Kennedy took the position that steel executives had illegally colluded to fix prices. He stated, "We're going for broke. [...] their expense accounts, where they've been and what they've been doing. [...] the FBI is to interview them all. [...] we can't lose this." The administration's actions influenced U.S. Steel to rescind the price increase. The Wall Street Journal wrote that the administration had acted "by naked power, by threats, [and] by agents of the state security police". Yale law professor Charles Reich opined in The New Republic that the administration had violated civil liberties by calling a grand jury to indict U.S. Steel for collusion so quickly. An editorial in The New York Times praised Kennedy's actions and said that the steel industry's price increase "imperil[ed] the economic welfare of the country by inviting a tidal wave of inflation". Nevertheless, the administration's Bureau of Budget reported the price increase would have caused a net gain for the GDP as well as a net budget surplus. The stock market, which had steadily declined since Kennedy's election in 1960, dropped 10% shortly after the administration's action on the steel industry took place.

Federal and military death penalty
During his administration, Kennedy oversaw the last federal execution prior to Furman v. Georgia, a 1972 case that led to a moratorium on federal executions. Victor Feguer was sentenced to death by an Iowa federal court and was executed on March 15, 1963. Kennedy commuted a death sentence imposed by a military court on seaman Jimmie Henderson on February 12, 1962, changing the penalty to life in prison.

On March 22, 1962, Kennedy signed into law HR5143 (PL87-423), which abolished the mandatory death penalty for first degree murder suspects in the District of Columbia, the only remaining jurisdiction in the United States with such a penalty. The death penalty has not been applied in the District of Columbia since 1957 and has now been abolished.

Civil rights movement

The turbulent end of state-sanctioned racial discrimination was one of the most pressing domestic issues of the 1960s. "Jim Crow" segregation was the established law in the Deep South. The U.S. Supreme Court had ruled in 1954 in Brown v. Board of Education that racial segregation in public schools was unconstitutional. Many schools, especially those in southern states, did not obey the Supreme Court's decision. The Court also prohibited segregation at other public facilities (such as buses, restaurants, theaters, courtrooms, bathrooms, and beaches) but it continued nonetheless.

Kennedy verbally supported racial integration and civil rights; during his 1960 presidential campaign, he telephoned Coretta Scott King, wife of the Reverend Martin Luther King Jr., who had been jailed while trying to integrate a department store lunch counter. Robert Kennedy called Georgia governor Ernest Vandiver and obtained King's release from prison, which drew additional black support to his brother's candidacy. Upon taking office in 1961, Kennedy postponed promised civil rights legislation he made while campaigning in 1960, recognizing that conservative Southern Democrats controlled congressional legislation. During his first year in office, Kennedy appointed many Black people to office including his May appointment of civil rights attorney Thurgood Marshall to the federal bench.

In his first State of the Union Address in January 1961, President Kennedy said, "The denial of constitutional rights to some of our fellow Americans on account of race—at the ballot box and elsewhere—disturbs the national conscience, and subjects us to the charge of world opinion that our democracy is not equal to the high promise of our heritage." Kennedy believed the grassroots movement for civil rights would anger many Southern whites and make it more difficult to pass civil rights laws in Congress, including anti-poverty legislation, and he distanced himself from it.

Kennedy was concerned with other issues in the early part of his administration, such as the Cold War, Bay of Pigs fiasco, and the situation in Southeast Asia. As articulated by his brother Robert, the administration's early priority was to "keep the president out of this civil rights mess". Civil rights movement participants, mainly those on the front line in the South, viewed Kennedy as lukewarm, especially concerning the Freedom Riders, who organized an integrated public transportation effort in the south, and who were repeatedly met with white mob violence, including by law enforcement officers, both federal and state. Kennedy assigned federal marshals to protect the Freedom Riders rather than using federal troops or uncooperative FBI agents. Robert Kennedy, speaking for the president, urged the Freedom Riders to "get off the buses and leave the matter to peaceful settlement in the courts". Kennedy feared sending federal troops would stir up "hated memories of Reconstruction" after the Civil War among conservative Southern whites.

On March 6, 1961, Kennedy signed Executive Order 10925, which required government contractors to "take affirmative action to ensure that applicants are employed and that employees are treated during employment without regard to their race, creed, color, or national origin". It established the President's Committee on Equal Employment Opportunity. Displeased with Kennedy's pace addressing the issue of segregation, Martin Luther King Jr. and his associates produced a document in 1962 calling on Kennedy to follow in the footsteps of Abraham Lincoln and use an Executive Order to deliver a blow for civil rights as a kind of Second Emancipation Proclamation. Kennedy did not execute the order.

In September 1962, James Meredith enrolled at the University of Mississippi but was prevented from entering. In response to that, Attorney General Robert Kennedy sent 127 U.S. Marshals and 316 U.S. Border Patrol and 97 Federal correctional officers who were deputized as marshals. The Ole Miss riot of 1962 left two civilians dead and 300 people injured, prompting President Kennedy to send in 3,000 troops to quell the riot. Meredith did finally enroll for a class, and Kennedy regretted not sending in troops earlier. Kennedy began doubting as to whether the "evils of Reconstruction" of the 1860s and 1870s he had been taught or believed in were true. The instigating subculture during the Ole Miss riot, and many other racially ignited events, was the Ku Klux Klan. On November 20, 1962, Kennedy signed Executive Order 11063, which prohibited racial discrimination in federally supported housing or "related facilities". Despite this, in Boston, the Boston Housing Authority (BHA) Board would continue to actively segregate the public housing developments in the city during the John F. Collins administration (1960–1968), with BHA departments engaging in bureaucratic resistance against integration through at least 1966 and the Board retaining control over tenant assignment until 1968.

Both Kennedy and Robert Kennedy were concerned about King's ties to suspected communists Jack O'Dell and Stanley Levison. After Kennedy and his civil rights expert Harris Wofford pressed King to ask both men to resign from the SCLC, King agreed to ask only O'Dell to resign from the organization and allowed Levison, whom he regarded as a trusted advisor, to remain.

In early 1963, Kennedy related to Martin Luther King Jr. his thoughts on the prospects for civil rights legislation: "If we get into a long fight over this in Congress, it will bottleneck everything else, and we will still get no bill." Civil rights clashes were on the rise that year. His brother Robert and Ted Sorensen pressed Kennedy to take more initiative on the legislative front.

On June 11, 1963, President Kennedy intervened when Alabama Governor George Wallace blocked the doorway to the University of Alabama to stop two African American students, Vivian Malone and James Hood, from attending. Wallace moved aside only after being confronted by Deputy Attorney General Nicholas Katzenbach and the Alabama U.S. National Guard, which had just been federalized by order of the president. That evening Kennedy gave his famous Report to the American People on Civil Rights on national television and radio, launching his initiative for civil rights legislation—to provide equal access to public schools and other facilities, and greater protection of voting rights.

His proposals became part of the Civil Rights Act of 1964. The day ended with the murder of an NAACP leader, Medgar Evers, in front of his home in Mississippi. As Kennedy had predicted, the day after his TV speech, and in reaction to it, House Majority leader Carl Albert called to advise him that his two-year signature effort in Congress to combat poverty in Appalachia (Area Redevelopment Administration) had been defeated, primarily by the votes of Southern Democrats and Republicans. When Arthur M. Schlesinger Jr. complimented Kennedy on his remarks, Kennedy bitterly replied, "Yes, and look at what happened to area development the very next day in the House." He then added, "But of course, I had to give that speech, and I'm glad that I did." On June 16, The New York Times published an editorial which argued that while Kennedy had initially "moved too slowly and with little evidence of deep moral commitment" in regards to civil rights he "now demonstrate[d] a genuine sense of urgency about eradicating racial discrimination from our national life".

Earlier, Kennedy had signed the executive order creating the Presidential Commission on the Status of Women on December 14, 1961. Former First Lady Eleanor Roosevelt led the commission. The Commission statistics revealed that women were also experiencing discrimination; its final report, documenting legal and cultural barriers, was issued in October 1963. Further, on June 10, 1963, Kennedy signed the Equal Pay Act of 1963, which amended the Fair Labor Standards Act and abolished wage disparity based on sex.

Over a hundred thousand people, predominantly African Americans, gathered in Washington for the civil rights March on Washington for Jobs and Freedom on August 28, 1963. Kennedy feared the March would have a negative effect on the prospects for the civil rights bills in Congress, and declined an invitation to speak. He turned over some of the details of the government's involvement to the Dept. of Justice, which channelled hundreds of thousands of dollars to the six sponsors of the March, including the N.A.A.C.P. and Martin Luther King's Southern Christian Leadership Conference (SCLC).

To ensure a peaceful demonstration, the organizers and Kennedy personally edited speeches that were inflammatory and agreed the March would be held on a Wednesday and would be over at 4:00 pm. Thousands of troops were placed on standby. Kennedy watched King's speech on TV and was very impressed. The March was considered a "triumph of managed protest", and not one arrest relating to the demonstration occurred. Afterwards, the March leaders accepted an invitation to the White House to meet with Kennedy and photos were taken. Kennedy felt that the March was a victory for him as well and bolstered the chances for his civil rights bill.

Nevertheless, the struggle was far from over. Three weeks later on Sunday, September 15, a bomb exploded at the 16th Street Baptist Church in Birmingham; by the end of the day, four African American children had died in the explosion, and two other children were shot to death in the aftermath. Due to this resurgent violence, the civil rights legislation underwent some drastic amendments that critically endangered any prospects for passage of the bill, to the outrage of the president. Kennedy called the congressional leaders to the White House and by the following day the original bill, without the additions, had enough votes to get it out of the House committee. Gaining Republican support, Senator Everett Dirksen promised the legislation would be brought to a vote preventing a Senate filibuster. The legislation was enacted by Kennedy's successor President Lyndon B. Johnson, prompted by Kennedy's memory, after his assassination in November, enforcing voting rights, public accommodations, employment, education, and the administration of justice.

Civil liberties

In February 1962, FBI Director J. Edgar Hoover, who was suspicious of civil-rights leader Martin Luther King Jr. and viewed him as an upstart troublemaker, presented the Kennedy administration with allegations that some of King's close confidants and advisers were communists. Concerned by these allegations, the FBI deployed agents to monitor King in the following months. Robert Kennedy and President Kennedy also both warned King to discontinue the suspect associations. After the associations continued, Robert Kennedy issued a written directive authorizing the FBI to wiretap King and other leaders of the Southern Christian Leadership Conference, King's civil rights organization, in October 1963.

Although Kennedy only gave written approval for limited wiretapping of King's phones "on a trial basis, for a month or so", Hoover extended the clearance so his men were "unshackled" to look for evidence in any areas of King's life they deemed worthy. The wiretapping continued through June 1966 and was revealed in 1968.

Immigration

During the 1960 campaign, Kennedy proposed an overhaul of American immigration and naturalization laws to ban discrimination based on national origin. He saw this proposal as an extension of his planned civil rights agenda as president. These reforms later became law through the Immigration and Nationality Act of 1965, which dramatically shifted the source of immigration from Northern and Western European countries towards immigration from Latin America and Asia. The policy change also shifted the emphasis on the selection of immigrants in favor of family reunification. The late president's brother, Senator Edward Kennedy of Massachusetts helped steer the legislation through the Senate.

Native American relations

Construction of the Kinzua Dam flooded  of Seneca nation land that they had occupied under the Treaty of 1794, and forced 600 Seneca to relocate to Salamanca, New York. Kennedy was asked by the American Civil Liberties Union to intervene and to halt the project, but he declined, citing a critical need for flood control. He expressed concern about the plight of the Seneca and directed government agencies to assist in obtaining more land, damages, and assistance to help mitigate their displacement.

Space policy

The Apollo program was conceived early in 1960, during the Eisenhower administration, as a follow-up to Project Mercury, to be used as a shuttle to an Earth-orbital space station, flights around the Moon, or landing on it. While NASA went ahead with planning for Apollo, funding for the program was far from certain, given Eisenhower's ambivalent attitude to manned spaceflight. As senator, Kennedy had been opposed to the space program and wanted to terminate it.

In constructing his presidential administration, Kennedy elected to retain Eisenhower's last science advisor Jerome Wiesner as head of the President's Science Advisory Committee. Wiesner was strongly opposed to manned space exploration, having issued a report highly critical of Project Mercury. Kennedy was turned down by seventeen candidates for NASA administrator before the post was accepted by James E. Webb, an experienced Washington insider who served President Truman as budget director and undersecretary of state. Webb proved to be adept at obtaining the support of Congress, the President, and the American people. Kennedy also persuaded Congress to amend the National Aeronautics and Space Act to allow him to delegate his chairmanship of the National Aeronautics and Space Council to the Vice President,
 both because of the knowledge of the space program Johnson gained in the Senate working for the creation of NASA, and to help keep the politically savvy Johnson occupied.

In Kennedy's January 1961 State of the Union address, he had suggested international cooperation in space. Khrushchev declined, as the Soviets did not wish to reveal the status of their rocketry and space capabilities. Early in his presidency, Kennedy was poised to dismantle the manned space program but postponed any decision out of deference to Johnson, who had been a strong supporter of the space program in the Senate.

This quickly changed on April 12, 1961, when Soviet cosmonaut Yuri Gagarin became the first person to fly in space, reinforcing American fears about being left behind in a technological competition with the Soviet Union. Kennedy now became eager for the U.S. to take the lead in the Space Race, for reasons of national security and prestige. On April 20, he sent a memo to Johnson, asking him to look into the status of America's space program, and into programs that could offer NASA the opportunity to catch up. After consulting with Wernher von Braun, Johnson responded approximately one week later, concluding that "we are neither making maximum effort nor achieving results necessary if this country is to reach a position of leadership". His memo concluded that a manned Moon landing was far enough in the future that it was likely the United States would achieve it first. Kennedy's advisor Ted Sorensen advised him to support the Moon landing, and on May 25, Kennedy announced the goal in a speech titled "Special Message to the Congress on Urgent National Needs":

... I believe that this nation should commit itself to achieving the goal, before this decade is out, of landing a man on the Moon and returning him safely to the Earth. No single space project in this period will be more impressive to mankind, or more important for the long-range exploration of space; and none will be so difficult or expensive to accomplish. 

After Congress authorized the funding, Webb began reorganizing NASA, increasing its staffing level, and building two new centers: a Launch Operations Center for the large Moon rocket northwest of Cape Canaveral Air Force Station, and a Manned Spacecraft Center on land donated through Rice University in Houston. Kennedy took the latter occasion as an opportunity to deliver another speech at Rice to promote the space effort on September 12, 1962, in which he said:

 No nation which expects to be the leader of other nations can expect to stay behind in this race for space. ... We choose to go to the Moon in this decade and do the other things, not because they are easy, but because they are hard. 

On November 21, 1962, in a cabinet meeting with NASA administrator Webb and other officials, Kennedy explained that the Moon shot was important for reasons of international prestige, and that the expense was justified. Johnson assured him that lessons learned from the space program had military value as well. Costs for the Apollo program were expected to reach $40 billion (equivalent to $ billion in ).

In a September 1963 speech before the United Nations, Kennedy urged cooperation between the Soviets and Americans in space, specifically recommending that Apollo be switched to "a joint expedition to the Moon". Khrushchev again declined, and the Soviets did not commit to a manned Moon mission until 1964. On July 20, 1969, almost six years after Kennedy's death, Apollo 11 landed the first manned spacecraft on the Moon.

Administration, Cabinet, and judicial appointments

Judicial appointments

Supreme Court

Kennedy appointed the following Justices to the Supreme Court of the United States:
 Byron White – 1962
 Arthur Goldberg – 1962

Other courts

In addition to his two Supreme Court appointments, Kennedy appointed 21 judges to the United States Courts of Appeals, and 102 judges to the United States district courts.

Assassination

President Kennedy was assassinated in Dallas at 12:30 p.m. Central Standard Time (CST) on Friday, November 22, 1963. He was in Texas on a political trip to smooth over frictions in the Democratic Party between liberals Ralph Yarborough and Don Yarborough (no relation) and conservative John Connally. Traveling in a presidential motorcade through downtown Dallas, he was shot once in the back, the bullet exiting via his throat, and once in the head.

Kennedy was taken to Parkland Hospital for emergency medical treatment, where he was pronounced dead 30 minutes later, at 1:00 p.m. (CST). He was 46 years old and had been in office for 1,036 days. Lee Harvey Oswald, an order filler at the Texas School Book Depository from which the shots were fired, was arrested for the murder of police officer J. D. Tippit and was subsequently charged with Kennedy's assassination. He denied shooting anyone, claiming he was a patsy, and was shot dead by Jack Ruby on November 24, before he could be prosecuted. Ruby was arrested and convicted for the murder of Oswald. Ruby successfully appealed his conviction and death sentence but became ill and died of cancer on January 3, 1967, while the date for his new trial was being set.

President Johnson quickly issued an executive order to create the Warren Commission—chaired by Chief Justice Earl Warren—to investigate the assassination. The commission concluded that Oswald acted alone in killing Kennedy and that Oswald was not part of any conspiracy. The results of this investigation are disputed by many. The assassination proved to be a pivotal moment in U.S. history because of its impact on the nation, and the ensuing political repercussions. A 2004 Fox News poll found that 66% of Americans thought there had been a conspiracy to kill President Kennedy, while 74% thought that there had been a cover-up. A Gallup Poll in November 2013 showed 61% believed in a conspiracy, and only 30% thought that Oswald did it alone. In 1979, the U.S. House Select Committee on Assassinations concluded, with one third of the committee dissenting, that it believed "that Kennedy was probably assassinated as a result of a conspiracy. The committee was unable to identify the other gunmen or the extent of the conspiracy." This conclusion was based largely on audio recordings of the shooting. Subsequently, investigative reports from the FBI's Technical Services Division and a specially appointed National Academy of Sciences Committee determined that "reliable acoustic data do not support a conclusion that there was a second gunman." The Justice Department concluded "that no persuasive evidence can be identified to support the theory of a conspiracy" in the Kennedy assassination.

Funeral

Kennedy's body was brought back to Washington after his assassination. Early on November 23, six military pallbearers carried the flag-draped coffin into the East Room of the White House, where he lay in repose for 24 hours. Then, the coffin was carried on a horse-drawn caisson to the Capitol to lie in state. Throughout the day and night, hundreds of thousands lined up to view the guarded casket, with a quarter million passing through the rotunda during the 18 hours of lying in state.

Kennedy's funeral service was held on November 25, at St. Matthew's Cathedral. The Requiem Mass was led by Cardinal Richard Cushing. About 1,200 guests, including representatives from over 90 countries, attended. After the service, Kennedy was buried at Arlington National Cemetery in Virginia.

Personal life, family, and reputation

The Kennedy family is one of the most established political families in the United States, having produced a president, three senators, three ambassadors, and multiple other representatives and politicians, both at the federal and state level. While a Congressman, Kennedy embarked on a seven-week trip to India, Japan, Vietnam, and Israel in 1951, at which point he became close with his then 25-year-old brother Bobby, as well as his 27-year-old sister Pat. Because they were several years apart in age, the brothers had previously seen little of each other. This  trip was the first extended time they had spent together and resulted in their becoming best friends. Bobby would eventually play a major role in his brother's career, serving as his brother's attorney general and presidential advisor. Bobby would later run for president in 1968 before his assassination, while another Kennedy brother, Ted, ran for president in 1980.

Kennedy came in third (behind Martin Luther King Jr. and Mother Teresa) in Gallup's List of Widely Admired People of the 20th century. Kennedy was a life member of the National Rifle Association.

Wife and children

Kennedy met his future wife, Jacqueline Lee "Jackie" Bouvier (1929–1994), when he was a congressman. Charles L. Bartlett, a journalist, introduced the pair at a dinner party. They were married a year after he was elected senator, on September 12, 1953. After suffering a miscarriage in 1955 and a stillbirth in 1956 (their daughter Arabella), their daughter Caroline was born in 1957 and is the only surviving member of JFK's immediate family. John Fitzgerald Kennedy Jr., nicknamed "John-John" by the press as a child, was born in late November 1960, 17 days after his father was elected. John Jr., a graduate of Brown University, died in 1999 when the small plane he was piloting crashed en route to Martha's Vineyard. In 1963, months before JFK's assassination, Jackie gave birth to a son, Patrick. However, he died after 2 days due to complications from birth.

Popular image

Kennedy and his wife were younger in comparison to the presidents and first ladies who preceded them, and both were popular in the media culture in ways more common to pop singers and movie stars than politicians, influencing fashion trends and becoming the subjects of numerous photo spreads in popular magazines. Although Eisenhower had allowed presidential press conferences to be filmed for television, Kennedy was the first president to ask for them to be broadcast live and made good use of the medium. In 1961 the Radio-Television News Directors Association presented Kennedy with its highest honor, the Paul White Award, in recognition of his open relationship with the media.

Mrs. Kennedy brought new art and furniture to the White House and directed its restoration. They invited a range of artists, writers and intellectuals to rounds of White House dinners, raising the profile of the arts in America. On the White House lawn, the Kennedys established a swimming pool and tree house, while Caroline attended a preschool along with 10 other children inside the home.

Kennedy was closely tied to popular culture, emphasized by songs such as "Twisting at the White House". Vaughn Meader's First Family comedy album, which parodied the president, the first lady, their family, and the administration, sold about four million copies.

In an interview a week after JFK's death, Jacqueline Kennedy mentioned his affection for the Broadway musical  Camelot and quoted its closing lines: "Don't let it be forgot, that once there was a spot, for one brief, shining moment that was known as Camelot." The term "Camelot" has come to be used as shorthand for the Kennedy administration and the charisma of the Kennedy family.

Health

Despite a privileged youth, Kennedy was plagued by a series of childhood diseases, including whooping cough, chicken pox, measles, and ear infections. These ailments compelled him to spend a considerable amount of time in bed (or at least indoors) convalescing. Three months prior to his third birthday, in 1920, Kennedy came down with scarlet fever, a highly contagious and life-threatening disease, and was admitted to Boston City Hospital.

Years after Kennedy's death, it was revealed that in September 1947, while Kennedy was 30 and in his first term in Congress, he was diagnosed by Sir Daniel Davis at The London Clinic with Addison's disease, a rare endocrine disorder. Davis estimated that Kennedy would not live for another year, while Kennedy himself hoped he could live for an additional ten. In 1966, White House physician Dr. Janet Travell revealed that Kennedy also had hypothyroidism. The presence of two endocrine diseases raises the possibility that Kennedy had autoimmune polyendocrine syndrome type 2 (APS 2).

Kennedy also suffered from chronic and severe back pain, for which he had surgery. Kennedy's condition may have had diplomatic repercussions, as he appears to have been taking a combination of drugs to treat severe back pain during the 1961 Vienna Summit with Soviet Premier Nikita Khrushchev. The combination included hormones, animal organ cells, steroids, vitamins, enzymes, and amphetamines, and possible potential side effects included hyperactivity, hypertension, impaired judgment, nervousness, and mood swings. Kennedy at one time was regularly seen by three doctors, one of whom, Max Jacobson, was unknown to the other two, as his mode of treatment was controversial and used for the most severe bouts of back pain.

Into late 1961, disagreements existed among Kennedy's doctors concerning his proper balance of medication and exercise. Kennedy preferred the former because he was short on time and desired immediate relief. During that time, the president's physician, George Burkley, did set up some gym equipment in the White House basement, where Kennedy did stretching exercises for his back three times a week. Details of these and other medical problems were not publicly disclosed during Kennedy's lifetime. The President's primary White House physician, George Burkley, realized that treatments by Jacobson and Travell, including the excessive use of steroids and amphetamines, were medically inappropriate, and took action to remove Kennedy from their care.

In 2002, Robert Dallek wrote an extensive history of Kennedy's health. Dallek was able to consult a collection of Kennedy-associated papers from the years 1955–1963, including X-rays and prescription records from the files of Dr. Travell. According to Travell's records, during his presidential years Kennedy suffered from high fevers; stomach, colon, and prostate issues; abscesses; high cholesterol; and adrenal problems. Travell kept a "Medicine Administration Record", cataloging Kennedy's medications: "injected and ingested corticosteroids for his adrenal insufficiency; procaine shots and ultrasound treatments and hot packs for his back; Lomotil, Metamucil, paregoric, phenobarbital, testosterone, and trasentine to control his diarrhea, abdominal discomfort, and weight loss; penicillin and other antibiotics for his urinary-tract infections and an abscess; and Tuinal to help him sleep."

Family incidents

Kennedy's older brother Joseph P. Kennedy Jr. was killed in action in 1944 at age 29 when his plane exploded over the English Channel during a first attack execution of Operation Aphrodite during World War II. His sister Rose Marie "Rosemary" Kennedy was born in 1918 with intellectual disabilities and underwent a prefrontal lobotomy at age 23, leaving her incapacitated until her death in 2005. Another sister Kathleen Agnes "Kick" Kennedy died in a plane crash en route to France in 1948. His wife Jacqueline Kennedy suffered a miscarriage in 1955 and a stillbirth in 1956: a daughter informally named Arabella. A son, Patrick Bouvier Kennedy, died two days after birth in August 1963.

Affairs and friendships

Kennedy was single in the 1940s while having relationships with Danish journalist Inga Arvad and actress Gene Tierney. During his time as a senator, he had an affair with Gunilla von Post, who later wrote that the future president tried to end his marriage to be with her before having any children with his wife. Kennedy was also reported to have had affairs with Marilyn Monroe, Judith Campbell, Mary Pinchot Meyer, Marlene Dietrich, Mimi Alford, and his wife's press secretary, Pamela Turnure.

The full extent of Kennedy's relationship with Monroe (who in 1962 famously sang "Happy Birthday, Mr. President" at Kennedy's birthday celebration) is not known, though it has been reported that they spent a weekend together in March 1962 while he was staying at Bing Crosby's house. Furthermore, people at the White House switchboard noted that Monroe had called Kennedy during 1962. J. Edgar Hoover, the FBI director, received reports about Kennedy's indiscretions. These included an alleged East German spy Ellen Rometsch. According to historian Michael Beschloss, in July 1963, Hoover reportedly informed Bobby Kennedy about the affair. Hoover told the attorney general that he had information that the president, as well as others in Washington, had been involved with a woman "suspected as a Soviet intelligence agent, someone linked to East German intelligence". Bobby Kennedy reportedly took the matter sufficiently seriously to raise it with leading Democratic and Republican figures in Congress. Former Secret Service agent Larry Newman recalled "morale problems" that the president's indiscretions engendered within the Secret Service.

Kennedy inspired affection and loyalty from the members of his team and his supporters. According to Reeves, this included "the logistics of Kennedy's liaisons ... [which] required secrecy and devotion rare in the annals of the energetic service demanded by successful politicians." Kennedy believed that his friendly relationship with members of the press would help protect him from public revelations about his sex life.

Lem Billings was Kennedy's "oldest and best friend" from the time they attended Choate together until Kennedy's death.

Historical evaluations and legacy

Presidency

The US Special Forces had a special bond with Kennedy. "It was President Kennedy who was responsible for the rebuilding of the Special Forces and giving us back our Green Beret," said Forrest Lindley, a writer for the US military newspaper Stars and Stripes who served with Special Forces in Vietnam. This bond was shown at Kennedy's funeral. At the commemoration of the 25th anniversary of Kennedy's death, General Michael D. Healy, the last commander of Special Forces in Vietnam, spoke at Arlington National Cemetery. Later, a wreath in the form of the Green Beret would be placed on the grave, continuing a tradition that began the day of his funeral when a sergeant in charge of a detail of Special Forces men guarding the grave placed his beret on the coffin. Kennedy was the first of six presidents to have served in the U.S. Navy, and one of the enduring legacies of his administration was the creation in 1961 of another special forces command, the Navy SEALs, which Kennedy enthusiastically supported.

Kennedy's civil rights proposals led to the Civil Rights Act of 1964. President Lyndon B. Johnson, Kennedy's successor, took up the mantle and pushed the landmark Civil Rights Act through a bitterly divided Congress by invoking the slain president's memory. President Johnson then signed the Act into law on July 2, 1964. This civil rights law ended what was known as the "Solid South" and certain provisions were modeled after the Civil Rights Act of 1875, signed into law by President Ulysses S. Grant.

Kennedy's continuation of Presidents Harry S. Truman and Dwight D. Eisenhower's policies of giving economic and military aid to South Vietnam left the door open for President Johnson's escalation of the conflict. At the time of Kennedy's death, no final policy decision had been made as to Vietnam, leading historians, cabinet members, and writers to continue to disagree on whether the Vietnam conflict would have escalated to the point it did had he survived. His agreement to the NSAM 263 action of withdrawing 1,000 troops by the end of 1963, and his earlier 1963 speech at American University, suggest that he was ready to end the Vietnam War. The Vietnam War contributed greatly to a decade of national difficulties, amid violent disappointment on the political landscape.

Many of Kennedy's speeches (especially his inaugural address) are considered iconic; and despite his relatively short term in office, and the lack of major legislative changes coming to fruition during his term, he is considered by many presidential historians to be in the upper echelon of presidents. Some excerpts of Kennedy's inaugural address are engraved on a plaque at his grave at Arlington. In 2018 The Times published an audio recreation of the "watchmen on the walls of world freedom" speech he was scheduled to deliver at the Dallas Trade Mart on November 22, 1963.

In 1961, he was awarded the Laetare Medal by the University of Notre Dame, considered the most prestigious award for American Catholics. He was posthumously awarded the Pacem in Terris Award (Latin: Peace on Earth). It was named after a 1963 encyclical letter by Pope John XXIII that calls upon all people of goodwill to secure peace among all nations. Kennedy also posthumously received the Presidential Medal of Freedom in 1963.

Memorials and eponyms

A small sample of the extensive list at the main article (link above) includes:
 Idlewild Airport in Queens, New York City, nation's busiest international gateway, renamed John F. Kennedy International Airport on December 24, 1963
 NASA Launch Operations Center in Merritt Island, Florida named the John F. Kennedy Space Center on November 29, 1963.
 , U.S. Navy aircraft carrier ordered in April 1964, launched May 1967, decommissioned August 2007; nicknamed "Big John"
 Kennedy half dollar, first minted in 1964
 John F. Kennedy School of Government, part of Harvard University, renamed in 1966
 John F. Kennedy Federal Building in the Government Center section of Boston, opened in 1966
 John Fitzgerald Kennedy Memorial, opened in 1970 in Dallas
 National cultural center was named John F. Kennedy Center for the Performing Arts in 1964, opened in 1971 in Washington, D.C.
 John F. Kennedy Presidential Library and Museum on Columbia Point in Boston; opened in 1979
 Statue of John F. Kennedy by Isabel McIlvain on the grounds of the Massachusetts State House in Boston; dedicated on May 29, 1990.
 , U.S. Navy aircraft carrier that began construction in 2011, and was scheduled to be placed in commission in 2020

Works

Audio

Books

Video
 Newsreel footage of the inauguration ceremony and speeches

See also

 Assassination of Robert F. Kennedy
 Cultural depictions of John F. Kennedy
 Presidential transition of John F. Kennedy
 Doyle, William, PT 109: An American Epic of War, Survival, and the Destiny of John F. Kennedy, (2015), New York, Harper Collins, ISBN 978-0-06-234658-2 
 Electoral history of John F. Kennedy
 1960 United States presidential debates
 Eyre Square
 Jesuit Ivy
 Kennedy Doctrine
 Lincoln–Kennedy coincidences urban legend
 List of memorials to John F. Kennedy
 Orville Nix, photographer of a film of the assassination
 "Senator, you're no Jack Kennedy" retort by Senator Lloyd Bentsen, 1988 VP debate
 The Torch of Friendship
 Timeline of the presidency of John F. Kennedy
 Zapruder film
 Abraham Zapruder, photographer of the primary film of assassination

General

 History of the United States (1945–1964)
 List of assassinated American politicians
 List of presidents of the United States
 List of presidents of the United States by previous experience
 List of presidents of the United States who died in office
 List of United States presidential assassination attempts and plots
 Presidents of the United States on U.S. postage stamps

Notes

References

Citations

Works cited

Further reading

 
 
 Casey, Shaun. The Making of a Catholic President: Kennedy vs. Nixon 1960 (2009)
 Collier, Peter & Horowitz, David. The Kennedys (1984)
 Cottrell, John. Assassination! The World Stood Still (1964)
 
 Fay, Paul B., Jr. The Pleasure of His Company (1966)
 Freedman, Lawrence. Kennedy's Wars: Berlin, Cuba, Laos and Vietnam (2000)
 Fursenko, Aleksandr and Timothy Naftali. One Hell of a Gamble: Khrushchev, Castro and Kennedy, 1958–1964 (1997)
 Giglio, James. The Presidency of John F. Kennedy (1991)
 Hamilton, Nigel. JFK: Reckless Youth (1992)
 Harper, Paul, and Krieg, Joann P. eds. John F. Kennedy: The Promise Revisited (1988)
 Harris, Seymour E. The Economics of the Political Parties, with Special Attention to Presidents Eisenhower and Kennedy (1962)
 Haas, Lawrence J. The Kennedys in the World: How Jack, Bobby, and Ted Remade America's Empire (2021)
 Heath, Jim F. Decade of Disillusionment: The Kennedy–Johnson Years (1976)
 Hersh, Seymour. The Dark Side of Camelot (1997)
 Kunz, Diane B. The Diplomacy of the Crucial Decade: American Foreign Relations during the 1960s (1994)
 Logevall, Fredrik. JFK: Coming of Age in the American Century, 1917-1956 (Random House, 2020)
 Lynch, Grayston L. Decision for Disaster: Betrayal at the Bay of Pigs (2000)
 Manchester, William. Portrait of a President: John F. Kennedy in Profile (1967) online, popular biography
 
 Massa, Mark S. "A Catholic for President: John F. Kennedy and the Secular Theology of the Houston Speech, 1960." Journal of Church and State 39 (1997): 297–317.
 Newman, John M. JFK and Vietnam: Deception, Intrigue, and the Struggle for Power (1992)
 Parmet, Herbert. Jack: The Struggles of John F. Kennedy (1980)
 Parmet, Herbert. JFK: The Presidency of John F. Kennedy (1983)
 Parmet, Herbert. "The Kennedy Myth". In Myth America: A Historical Anthology, Volume II. Gerster, Patrick, and Cords, Nicholas. (editors.) (1997)
 Rabe, Stephen G. John F. Kennedy: World Leader (Potomac Books, 2010) 189 pages
 Reeves, Thomas. A Question of Character: A Life of John F. Kennedy (1991); hostile biography
 Sabato, Larry J. The Kennedy Half-Century: The Lasting Legacy of John F. Kennedy (2013)
 Schlesinger, Arthur Jr. Robert Kennedy and His Times (2018) [1978]
 Whalen, Thomas J. JFK and His Enemies: A Portrait of Power (2014)

Primary sources
 Goldzwig, Steven R. and Dionisopoulos, George N., eds. In a Perilous Hour: The Public Address of John F. Kennedy (1995)
 Kennedy, Jacqueline. Jacqueline Kennedy: Historic Conversations on Life with John F. Kennedy (2011). Hyperion Books.

Historiography and memory
 Abramson, Jill. "Kennedy, the Elusive President", The New York Times Book Review October 22, 2013, notes that 40,000 books have been published about JFK
 Craig, Campbell. "Kennedy's international legacy, fifty years on." International affairs 89.6 (2013): 1367–1378. online
 Hellmann, John. The Kennedy Obsession: The American Myth of JFK (1997)
 

 Knott, Stephen F. Coming to Terms with John F. Kennedy (2022) excerpt
 Santa Cruz, Paul H. Making JFK Matter: Popular Memory and the 35th President (Denton: University of North Texas Press, 2015) xxiv, 363 pp.
 Selverstone, Marc J., ed. A Companion to John F. Kennedy (Wiley-Blackwell, 2014), Topical essays by scholars focusing on the historiography

External links

Official
 John F. Kennedy Presidential Library and Museum
 John Fitzgerald Kennedy National Historic Site
 White House biography

Media coverage
 
 
 "Life Portrait of John F. Kennedy", from C-SPAN's American Presidents: Life Portraits, November 5, 1999
 Radio coverage of the assassination of President Kennedy as broadcast on WCCO-AM Radio (Minneapolis) and CBS Radio

Other

 John F. Kennedy: A Resource Guide – the Library of Congress
 Extensive Essays on JFK with shorter essays on each member of his cabinet and First Lady – Miller Center of Public Affairs
 Kennedy Administration from Office of the Historian, United States Government Printing Office, Washington, D.C.
 
 
 
 
 
 Kennedy Convocation Collection at the Amherst College Archives & Special Collections, documenting one of his last visits before his assassination

 
1917 births
1963 deaths
1956 United States vice-presidential candidates
1963 murders in the United States
20th-century American journalists
American male journalists
20th-century American politicians
20th-century American male writers
20th-century presidents of the United States
20th-century Roman Catholics
Alumni of the London School of Economics
American people of Irish descent
American people of the Vietnam War
Articles containing video clips
Assassinated presidents of the United States
Bouvier family
Burials at Arlington National Cemetery
Candidates in the 1960 United States presidential election
Canterbury School (Connecticut) alumni
Catholics from Massachusetts
Choate Rosemary Hall alumni
Deaths by firearm in Texas
Democratic Party members of the United States House of Representatives from Massachusetts
Democratic Party presidents of the United States
Democratic Party (United States) presidential nominees
Democratic Party United States senators from Massachusetts
Journalists from Massachusetts
Harvard College alumni
John F
Laetare Medal recipients
Liberalism in the United States
Male murder victims
Military personnel from Massachusetts
People associated with the assassination of John F. Kennedy
People from Barnstable, Massachusetts
People from Georgetown (Washington, D.C.)
People murdered in Texas
People of the Cold War
People of the Congo Crisis
Politicians from Boston
Politicians from Brookline, Massachusetts
Presidential Medal of Freedom recipients
Presidents of the United States
Pulitzer Prize for Biography or Autobiography winners
Recipients of the Navy and Marine Corps Medal
Riverdale Country School alumni
Space advocates
Star class sailors
Time Person of the Year
United States Navy personnel of World War II
United States Navy officers
Writers from Boston
United States Navy reservists
Members of the Benevolent and Protective Order of Elks
1960s assassinated politicians